The vesper sparrow (Pooecetes gramineus) is a medium-sized New World sparrow. It is the only member of the genus Pooecetes.

Taxonomy 
The Vesper Sparrow is believed to be most closely related to the Lark sparrow. It is the only species in the genus Pooecetes, meaning grass dweller.

Description 
Adults have light brown upper-parts and light under-parts, both with darker streaking. There are three features that are unique to the Vesper Sparrow. The first is the presence of a small, white ring surrounding the eyes. The second is the flash of white tail feathers that occurs during flight. The third is the presence of a chestnut patch on the shoulder. However, this is usually not visible to an observer.

Another notable characteristic is that some Sparrows, especially west of the Cascades, tend to have a more pinkish hue. They also do not have a bold eyeline found in some sparrows.

Measurements:

 Length: 5.1-6.3 in (13-16 cm)
 Weight: 0.7-1.0 oz (20-28 g)
 Wingspan: 9.4 in (24 cm)

Habitat 
Vesper sparrows are primarily found across Canada and most of the northern United States. Unlike some other sparrows in the regions they are found, Vesper sparrows are located in lower elevations of grassy areas such as dry grasslands, sagebrush and fields.

Behavior 
Vesper sparrows tend to be more grounded to the shrub area, often taking dust baths and hopping around. Their courtship involves the male sparrow running with his wings raised and occasionally jumping around to sing its song. These birds forage on the ground, mainly eating insects and seeds. Outside the nesting season they often feed in small flocks.

Song 
The male sings from a higher perch, such as a shrub or fencepost, which indicates his ownership of the nesting territory. The musical song begins with two pairs of repeated whistled notes and ends in a series of trills, somewhat similar to that of the song sparrow. They have slurred whistles with one lower pitch followed by a second higher pitch. Furthermore, Vesper sparrows make use of short descending trills as a part of their song.

Nesting 
Vesper sparrows have loose nests in a cup form on the ground. Females lay 3-5 eggs during May, they incubate for around 2 weeks, and their young fledge in a week. Two broods are raised per season by two sparrows. Breeding usually occurs in open bushy areas across North America.

Migration 
Vesper sparrows migrate to the eastern United States, the central United States, Mexico and the Gulf Coast. They migrate to the aforementioned regions around September, with the onset of fall, and return during March as spring arrives to the north.

Threats to Population 
While the species as a whole is not threatened or endangered, it has faced declines in population. Between 1970 and 2014, the Vesper Sparrow population has decreased by 30% and currently has an estimated population of around 34 million. The species has a delicate relationship with agricultural land. The loss of farmland due to conversions to more developed regions has created a degree of habitat loss caused by a reduction in space available for nesting. However, the presence of farmland has also damaged the population. Improper cultivator operations including early and frequent harvesting have destroyed nests and eggs. Fallow strips around farmland have also contributed to habitat loss. The reduction in cover can increase exposure to predators.

References

Further reading
 Jones, S. L., and J. E. Cornely. 2002. Vesper Sparrow (Pooecetes gramineus). In The Birds of North America, No. 624 (A. Poole and F. Gill, eds.). The Birds of North America, Inc., Philadelphia, PA

External links
Vesper Sparrow - Pooecetes gramineus - USGS Patuxent Bird Identification InfoCenter

vesper sparrow
vesper sparrow
Birds of North America
vesper sparrow
Taxa named by Johann Friedrich Gmelin